The Atlantic and French Broad Valley Railroad was a railroad that served South Carolina in the period immediately following the Reconstruction Era of the United States.

Creation
The Atlantic and French Broad Valley was created in 1878 by an act that changed the name of the Belton, Williamston and Easley Railroad. The Belton, Williamston and Easley was a railroad intended to serve the South Carolina Upstate region, specifically to connect Belton, South Carolina, and Easley, South Carolina. No such line was ever actually constructed.

Consolidation
The Atlantic and French Broad River was consolidated with the Edgefield, Trenton and Aiken Railroad in 1882 to form the French Broad and Atlantic Railway.

See also
 Belton, Williamston and Easley Railroad
 Carolina and Cumberland Gap Railway
 Carolina, Cumberland Gap and Chicago Railway
 Edgefield Branch Railroad
 Edgefield, Trenton and Aiken Railroad
 French Broad and Atlantic Railway

References

Defunct South Carolina railroads
Railway companies established in 1878
Railway companies disestablished in 1882
American companies established in 1878
American companies disestablished in 1882